Leon Reed is a former American football quarterback who played one season with the Maryland Commandos of the Arena Football League. He played college football at the University of Tennessee at Martin. At Tennessee–Martin, Reed broke the school record for total offense in a season in 1987 with 2,106 yards. He started in the final game of the 1989 Arena Football League season for the Commandos.

Reed was a member of the Winnipeg Blue Bombers of the Canadian Football League (CFL).

References

External links
Just Sports Stats

Further reading

Living people
Year of birth missing (living people)
American football quarterbacks
African-American players of American football
UT Martin Skyhawks football players
Winnipeg Blue Bombers players
Maryland Commandos players
Denver Dynamite (arena football) players
21st-century African-American people